Defending champion Malcolm Whitman defeated Jahial Parmly Paret in the challenge round, 6–1, 6–2, 3–6, 7–5 to win the men's singles tennis title at the 1899 U.S. National Championships.

Draw

Challenge round

Finals

Earlier rounds

Section 1

Section 2

Section 3

Section 4

References
 

Men's singles
1899